Seymour Jones (October 19, 1862 – March 13, 1951) was an American politician who served in the Oregon House of Representatives. A state representative from Marion County from 1916 to 1921, he was chosen to serve as Speaker of that body from 1919 to 1921. Jones also served as Oregon's state marketing agent from 1927 to 1931.

References

Speakers of the Oregon House of Representatives
Republican Party members of the Oregon House of Representatives
1962 deaths
1862 births
Politicians from Salem, Oregon
Oregon lawyers
Ranchers from Oregon
Lawyers from Salem, Oregon